Weircrest is an unincorporated community in Hancock County, West Virginia, United States.

References 

Unincorporated communities in West Virginia
Unincorporated communities in Hancock County, West Virginia